Blackstrap may refer to:

Blackstrap molasses, a by-product of sugar processing
Black Strap Molasses (song)
Blackstrap (electoral district), a federal electoral district in Saskatchewan, Canada
Blackstrap Lake, a man-made lake in Saskatchewan
Blackstrap Provincial Park, a park and recreation area in Saskatchewan, Canada
For Blackstrap Ski Hill, a former ski and snowboarding hill, see Blackstrap Provincial Park#Mount Blackstrap